Mehmels is a municipality in the Schmalkalden-Meiningen district of Thuringia, Germany.

References

Schmalkalden-Meiningen
Duchy of Saxe-Meiningen